Androsterone sulfate, also known as 3α-hydroxy-5α-androstan-17-one 3α-sulfate, is an endogenous, naturally occurring steroid and one of the major urinary metabolites of androgens. It is a steroid sulfate which is formed from sulfation of androsterone by the steroid sulfotransferase SULT2A1 and can be desulfated back into androsterone by steroid sulfatase.

See also
 Androsterone glucuronide
 Steroid sulfate
 C19H30O5S

References

External links
 Metabocard for Androsterone Sulfate (HMDB02759) - Human Metabolome Database

5α-Reduced steroid metabolites
Androgen esters
Androstanes
Human metabolites
Ketones
Sulfate esters